The 2005 Setanta Cup was the first edition of a club football competition featuring teams from both football associations on the island of Ireland. It was inaugurated as a cross-border competition between clubs from the League of Ireland in the Republic of Ireland and the Irish League in Northern Ireland.

The cup is sponsored by Setanta Sports; the Irish sports television network. The competition was launched with Setanta providing support for prize money (€350,000) and sponsorship (€1.6 million over 4 years).

For this season the cup was simply known as the Setanta Cup before being renamed the Setanta Sports Cup from 2006 onwards.

Glentoran beat Longford Town 2–1 in the first ever game of the competition on 15 March 2005. The first final saw Belfast side Linfield defeat Dublin's Shelbourne 2–0 at Tolka Park in Dublin on 21 May 2005 to collect the winner's prize of €150,000.

Format
The teams would be split into two groups of 3 teams and play each other twice, once at home and once away. The winners of each group would play in a single game final, to be held in Tolka Park if at least one team from the Republic of Ireland was involved.  If the final was played between two teams from Northern Ireland, the final would be held at Windsor Park.

Qualification

League of Ireland
Shelbourne qualified by winning the 2004 League of Ireland Premier Division title. Longford Town qualified by winning the 2004 FAI Cup Final. Cork City took the third spot by finishing second in the 2004 League of Ireland Premier Division.

Irish League
Linfield qualified by winning the 2003–04 Irish Premier League. Glentoran qualified by winning the 2003–04 Irish Cup. The third spot went to Portadown for finishing second in the 2003–04 Irish Premier League.

Following a draw (in which league winners were kept apart), the teams were placed as follows;

Group 1; Linfield, Longford Town, Glentoran
Group 2; Shelbourne, Portadown, Cork City

Group stage

Group 1

Group 2

Final

Goalscorers
3 goals
  Gary Hamilton (Portadown)

2 goals

  Richie Baker (Shelbourne)
  Jason Byrne (Shelbourne)
  Glenn Ferguson (Linfield)
  Michael Halliday (Glentoran)
  Paul McAreavey (Linfield)
  Stephen Paisley (Longford Town)
  Peter Thompson (Linfield)

1 goal

  Denis Behan (Cork City)
  Wesley Boyle (Portadown)
  Kevin Doyle (Cork City)
  Jamie Harris (Shelbourne)
  Shaun Holmes (Glentoran)
  Paul Keegan (Longford Town)
  Darren Kelly (Portadown)
  Stuart King (Linfield)
  Davy Larmour (Linfield)
  Darren Lockhart (Glentoran)
  Gavin Melaugh (Glentoran)
  Tim Mouncey (Linfield)
  William Murphy (Linfield)
  Andy Myler (Longford Town)
  Stephen Parkhouse (Glentoran)

1 own goal
  Philip Simpson (Glentoran)

References

External links
 Official Setanta Cup Site

2005
1
Set